Thelma Amelina Plumbe (born 21 December 1994), known professionally as Thelma Plum, is an Aboriginal Australian singer, songwriter, guitarist and musician from Delungra, New South Wales. Her father is renowned lore-man Paul Winanga-li Gii Spearim. Her debut album, Better in Blak, was released on 30 July 2019 and peaked at number 4 on the ARIA Albums Chart. 

Plum has received various accolades, including for Best Cover Art at the 2019 ARIA Music Awards for Dennis Pfitzner's artwork.

Early life
Thelma Amelina Plumbe was born on 21 December 1994 in Brisbane. She is a Gamilaraay woman from Delungra, New South Wales. Plum graduated from the Music Industry College, Brisbane and spent most of her early life in that city.

Career

2012–2017: Triple J Unearthed and early EPs
In May 2012, Plum uploaded the tracks "Blackbird" and "Father Said" onto Triple J Unearthed and in July 2012, won the inaugural  Triple J's National Indigenous Unearthed Music competition and was nominated for a Deadly award for Most Promising New Talent.. "Father Said" was released in November 2012 as her official debut single. Plum released her debut extended play, Rosie, in March 2013 and followed with her second EP, Monsters (July 2014). By that time she had relocated to Melbourne.

Plum appeared at Womadelaide in 2014 and 2019, has toured around Australia and has been on rotation nationally on Triple J.

2018–2021: Better in Blak
Plum released her debut album, Better in Blak, in July 2019. The video for the single, "Better in Blak", was nominated for Film Clip of the Year at the National Indigenous Music Awards. In October 2019 she came at No. 7 in Happy Mag's list of "The 15 Australian female artists changing the game right now." At the ARIA Music Awards of 2019 she received six nominations and won Best Cover Art for Emilie Pfitzner's work on her album.

In January 2020, Plum became the highest ranking Indigenous artist ever in the Triple J Hottest 100, when "Better in Blak" charted at number 9. Two months later, she was diagnosed with COVID-19 during the COVID-19 pandemic.

In May 2020, Plum released a cover of Powderfinger's "These Days". In October, she performed at the 2020 AFL Grand Final.

2022: Meanjin and When Rosie Met Monsters
In July 2022, Plum announced the forthcoming release of her third EP, Meanjin, alongside its second single "When It Rains It Pours".

In November 2022, Plum announced the forthcoming release of When Rosie Met Monsters, compiling the EPs Rosie and Monsters together on vinyl, CD and cassette.

Discography

Studio albums

Compilation albums

Extended plays

Singles

As lead artist

As featured artist

Other charted songs

Awards

APRA Awards
The APRA Awards are held in Australia and New Zealand by the Australasian Performing Right Association to recognise songwriting skills, sales and airplay performance by its members annually. Plum has been nominated for two awards.

! 
|-
| rowspan="2"| 2020
| "Better in Blak"
| APRA Song of the Year
| 
| rowspan="2"| 
|-
| herself
| Breakthrough Songwriter of the Year
| 
|-
| 2021 || herself || Breakthrough Songwriter of the Year ||  || 
|-
| 2023 || "Backseat of My Mind"|| APRA Song of the Year ||  ||  
|-

ARIA Awards

The ARIA Music Awards is an annual awards ceremony that recognises excellence, innovation, and achievement across all genres of Australian music. Thelma Plum won an award from six nominations in 2019.

! 
|-
| rowspan="6"| 2019
| Emilie Pfitzner for Thelma Plum - Better in Blak
| Best Cover Art
| 
| rowspan="6"|
|-
| Claudia Sangiorgi Dalimore for Thelma Plum – "Better in Blak"
| ARIA Award for Best Video
| 
|-
| rowspan="4"|Better in Blak
| Album of the Year
| 
|-
| Best Female Artist
| 
|-
| Best Pop Release
| 
|-
| Breakthrough Artist
| 
|-
| 2021  
| Thelma Plum – Homecoming Queen Tour
| Best Australian Live Act
| 
| 
|-
| rowspan="3"| 2022
| rowspan="2"| Meanjin
| Best Solo Artist
| 
| rowspan="3"| 
|-
| Best Pop Release
| 
|-
| The Meanjin Tour 
| Best Australian Live Act
| 
|-

Australian Music Prize
The Australian Music Prize (the AMP) is an annual award of $30,000 given to an Australian band or solo artist in recognition of the merit of an album released during the year of award.

|-
| Australian Music Prize 2019
| Better in Blak
| Album of the Year
| 
|-

Australian Women in Music Awards
The Australian Women in Music Awards is an annual event that celebrates outstanding women in the Australian Music Industry who have made significant and lasting contributions in their chosen field. They commenced in 2018.

|-
| 2019
| Thelma Plum
| Songwriter Award
|

J Awards
The J Awards are an annual series of Australian music awards that were established by the Australian Broadcasting Corporation's youth-focused radio station Triple J. They commenced in 2005.

|-
| J Awards of 2012
| herself
| Unearthed Artist of the Year
| 
|-
| rowspan="2"| J Awards of 2019
| Better in Blak
| Australian Album of the Year
| 
|-
| "Better in Blak"
| Australian Video of the Year
| 
|-

National Indigenous Music Awards

The National Indigenous Music Awards (NIMAs) is an annual awards ceremony that recognises the achievements of Indigenous Australians in music. Thelma Plum has won two awards.

|-
| 2013
| Thelma Plum
| Best New Talent
| 
|-
| 2015
| "How Much Does Your Love Cost?"
| Song of the Year
| 
|-
| rowspan="2"| 2019
| Better in Blak
| Album of the Year
| 
|-
| "Better in Blak"
| Song of the Year
| 
|-
| rowspan="2"| 2020
| Thelma Plum
| Artist of the Year
| 
|-
| "Homecoming Queen"
| Song of the Year
| 
|-
| rowspan="2"| 2022
| Thelma Plum
| Artist of the Year
| 
|-
| "Backseat of My Mind"
| Song of the Year
| 
|-

National Live Music Awards
The National Live Music Awards (NLMAs) are a broad recognition of Australia's diverse live industry, celebrating the success of the Australian live scene. The awards commenced in 2016.

|-
| rowspan="2"| National Live Music Awards of 2019
| rowspan="2"| herself
| Live Voice of the Year
| 
|-
| Queensland Live Voice of the Year
| 
|-

Queensland Music Awards
The Queensland Music Awards (previously known as Q Song Awards) are annual awards celebrating Queensland, Australia's brightest emerging artists and established legends. They commenced in 2006.

 (wins only)
|-
| 2013
| "Rosie"
| Indigenous  Song of the Year
| 
|-
| 2020
| Better in Blak
| Album of the Year
| 
|-
|}

Rolling Stone Australia Awards
The Rolling Stone Australia Awards are awarded annually in January or February by the Australian edition of Rolling Stone magazine for outstanding contributions to popular culture in the previous year.

! 
|-
| 2023
| Meanjin 
| Best Record
| 
| 
|-

Vanda & Young Global Songwriting Competition
The Vanda & Young Global Songwriting Competition is an annual competition that "acknowledges great songwriting whilst supporting and raising money for Nordoff-Robbins" and is coordinated by Albert Music and APRA AMCOS. It commenced in 2009.

|-
| 2013
| "Breathe in Breathe Out"
| Vanda & Young Global Songwriting Competition
| style="background:tan;"| 3rd
|-
| 2020
| "Better in Blak"
| Vanda & Young Global Songwriting Competition
| style="background:gold;"| 1st
|}

References

External links
 

1994 births
Living people
ARIA Award winners
Australian women pop singers
Australian women singer-songwriters
Australian women guitarists
Australian folk singers
Gamilaraay
Indigenous Australian musicians
People from New England (New South Wales)